Brian James Pockar (October 27, 1959 – April 28, 1992) was a Canadian figure skater. He was the 1982 World bronze medalist, a three-time Canadian national champion (1978–80), and competed at the 1980 Winter Olympics. He was born and died in Calgary.

After turning pro, Pockar toured with Stars on Ice and worked as a choreographer. He died of AIDS in 1992. Scott Hamilton outed Pockar as gay in Hamilton's autobiography, Landing It.

Competitive highlights

References

 
 
 

1959 births
1992 deaths
AIDS-related deaths in Canada
Canadian male single skaters
Figure skaters at the 1980 Winter Olympics
Figure skaters from Calgary
Canadian LGBT sportspeople
Olympic figure skaters of Canada
Gay sportsmen
LGBT figure skaters
World Figure Skating Championships medalists
World Junior Figure Skating Championships medalists
20th-century Canadian LGBT people
20th-century Canadian people
Canadian gay men